Richard Earle Brown  is a Canadian politician, who was elected to the Legislative Assembly of Prince Edward Island in the 2007 provincial election. He represented the electoral district of Charlottetown-Victoria Park as a member of the Liberal Party.

He was first elected to the Legislative Assembly in a 1997 by-election, following the resignation of Wayne Cheverie. He was subsequently defeated by Bob MacMillan in the 2000 provincial election, but defeated MacMillan when he ran again in the 2003 election.

In June 2007, Brown was appointed to the Executive Council of Prince Edward Island as Minister of Development and Technology. In April 2008, he became Minister of Innovation and Advanced Learning. In January 2009, Brown was moved to Minister of Environment, Energy and Forestry. Brown was dropped from cabinet following the 2011 election. On May 20, 2015, Brown returned to cabinet as Minister of Workforce and Advanced Learning. He resigned from cabinet on February 15, 2017. On January 10, 2018, Brown returned to cabinet as Minister of Communities, Land and Environment. He was defeated when he ran for re-election in 2019.

References

External links
 Biography at Legislative Assembly of Prince Edward Island website

Living people
Members of the Executive Council of Prince Edward Island
People from Charlottetown
Prince Edward Island Liberal Party MLAs
21st-century Canadian politicians
1956 births